Tricholosporum tropicale is a species of fungus in the family Tricholomataceae. It is found in Mexico.

Taxonomy

The species was described as new to science in 1994 by mycologist Gastón Guzmán and colleagues. It was originally named Tricholosporum tropicalis.

Description

The color is bluish violet to greyish violet, drying to brownish. It is dry and smooth, although dry specimens may show radial grooves at the margin corresponding to the gills on the underside. The closely spaced gills have an adnate attachment to the stipe, and are pinkish brown to violet brown. It has a smooth surface that is whitish to light gray when fresh, drying to the same color as the cap. The flesh is whitish with a pleasant odor and taste.

Spores are cross-shaped, thin-walled, hyaline (translucent), and typically measure 4.8–5.6 by 3.2–4 µm. They have a negative staining reaction with Melzer's reagent, and feature a conspicuous hilar appendage. The basidia (spore-bearing cells) are club-shaped with clamps at the base, and measure 24–32 long by 4.8–5.6 µm wide. Clamp connections are common in the hyphae. The hymenium contains an abundance of cystidia on both the gill edges (cheilocystidia) and faces (pleurocystidia).

Similar species

The subtropical fungi Tricholosporum atroviolaceum and T. pseudosordidum are similar species with small spores. They can be distinguished from T. tropicale by their less robust fruit bodies, and microscopically by the relative dearth of cystidia.

Habitat and distribution

The type collection of Tricholosporum tropicale was discovered in September, fruiting singly on the ground in a cacao plantation. The location was a tropical rainforest in the State of Chiapas, Mexico.

References

External links

Mushroom Observer Images

tropicale
Fungi of Mexico
Fungi described in 1994
Fungi without expected TNC conservation status